John Garcia is the debut studio album of American vocalist John Garcia, released on July 25, 2014 via Napalm Records. Music videos were filmed for the songs "My Mind" and "Her Bullets' Energy".

Track listing

Notes
"Rolling Stoned" is a cover of the Black Mastiff song. Garcia produced Black Mastiff's second album, Music Machine, which released a year later.
"5000 Miles" was written by Danko Jones specifically for Garcia after Garcia often conversed with Jones about missing his family while touring.
"Her Bullets' Energy" is the oldest song on the record, written when Garcia was nineteen years old. Robby Krieger from The Doors performs on the track.
"All These Walls" is a re-recording of the song "Cactus Jumper" by Garcia's band Slo Burn, which appeared on demo tapes and unofficial releases of the band's EP, Amusing the Amazing. The song features bassist Nick Oliveri.

Chart positions

Personnel
Adapted from the John Garcia liner notes.

Musicians
 David Angstrom – instruments
 Gary Arce – instruments
 Tom Brayton – instruments
 Dandy Brown – instruments
 Monique Caravello – instruments
 Mark Diamond – instruments
 John Garcia – vocals, production
 Damon Garrison – instruments
 Ehren Groben – instruments
 Chris Hale – instruments
 Danko Jones – instruments
 Mikey Kocsandi – instruments
 Jack Kohler – instruments
 Robby Krieger – instruments
 Nick Oliveri – instruments

Production and additional personnel
 Jared Connor – design
 Michael Dumas – engineering (11)
 Vic Florencia – engineering (5)
 Gene Grimaldi – mastering
 Harper Hug – production, engineering, mixing
 Richard Sibbald – photography
 Trevor Whatever – production
 Sam Yong – illustrations, design

Release history

References

External links 
 

2014 debut albums
Napalm Records albums